The 1974–75 season was Real Madrid Club de Fútbol's 72nd season in existence and the club's 43rd consecutive season in the top flight of Spanish football.

Summary
The club clinched its 16th League title with a massive 12 points gap above runners-up Real Zaragoza catching the first spot early since round 6 of the tournament. After collapsing to the 8th place last season, changes came to the team in the summer: replacing interim coach Luis Molowny arrived new head coach former Yugoslavia side manager Miljan Miljanić, 1974 FIFA World Cup winner Paul Breitner replacing Ramón Grosso as a starter in midfield, and Argentine forward Roberto Martínez from Español (resulting in Oscar Más being transferred out the team). Teenage defender José Antonio Camacho and Rubiñán reinforced the defensive line replacing Zoco (retired) and José Luis. Additionally, Vicente del Bosque won the starter spot against ageing Velazquez in midfield. In the offensive line, Miljanic changed the side moving Gunter Netzer from midfield to forward position along with striker Roberto Martínez, and returned back from injuries was Santillana benching ageing Amancio. The squad scored 66 league goals, its best output in 10 seasons.

In the 1974–75 European Cup Winners' Cup, the team reached the quarter-finals being eliminated by Crvena Zvezda in a penalty shoot-out 5–6.

Also, during June the squad clinched "The Double" after winning the 1975 Copa del Generalísimo Final over Atlético Madrid on penalties 4–3 after a 0–0 draw.

Squad

Transfers

Competitions

La Liga

Position by round

League table

Matches

Copa del Generalísimo

Final

European Cup Winners' Cup

Quarter-finals

Statistics

Players statistics

References

External links
 BDFútbol

Real Madrid CF seasons
Spanish football championship-winning seasons
Real Madrid